Carex kraliana is a tussock-forming species of perennial sedge in the family Cyperaceae. It is native to eastern parts of the United States extending as far west as Texas.

See also
List of Carex species

References

kraliana
Plants described in 2002
Flora of Alabama
Flora of Arkansas
Flora of Florida
Flora of Kentucky
Flora of Louisiana
Flora of Maryland
Flora of Mississippi
Flora of Indiana
Flora of Georgia (U.S. state)
Flora of North Carolina
Flora of South Carolina
Flora of Ohio
Flora of Virginia
Flora of West Virginia
Flora of Tennessee
Flora of Texas